The sievert (symbol: Sv) is the SI derived unit of ionizing radiation dose

Sievert may also refer to:

 Sievert (name), German given name

People (surname) 
 Claus Sievert (1949), German-born American printmaker and illustrator.
 Hans-Heinrich Sievert (1909–1963), German Olympic decathlete
 José Joaquín Chaverri Sievert (born 1949), Cost Rican diplomat
 Paul Sievert (1895–1988), German Olympic racewalker
 Rolf Maximilian Sievert (1896–1966), Swedish medical physicist for whom the SI unit is named

Science and technology 
 Sievert chamber, an ionization chamber used in radiation dose measurements 
 Sievert integral, function commonly used in radiation transport calculations

See also 
 Sieverts (disambiguation)

Surnames from given names